Interstate 57 (I-57) is a north–south Interstate Highway in Missouri and Illinois that parallels the old Illinois Central Railroad for much of its route. It runs from Sikeston, Missouri, at I-55 to Chicago, Illinois, at I-94. I-57 essentially serves as a shortcut route for travelers headed between the South (Memphis, New Orleans, etc.) and Chicago, bypassing St. Louis, Missouri and Springfield, Illinois. In fact, both the control cities on the overhead signs and the destination mileage signs reference Memphis along southbound I-57, even as far north as its northern origin at I-94 in Chicago. Likewise, at its southern end, Chicago is the control city listed for I-57 on signs on northbound I-55 south of Sikeston, even though I-55 also goes to Chicago.

, I-57 has no spur routes nor are any planned for the near future. I-57 has one business loop in Charleston, Missouri.

Route description

Missouri 

In the state of Missouri, I-57 runs northbound from Sikeston to the Cairo I-57 Bridge over the Mississippi River north of Cairo, Illinois.

After ending southbound at I-55, the highway continues as U.S. Route 60 (US 60), which meets US 67 at Poplar Bluff, and, from there, US 67 goes south to Little Rock, Arkansas.

Illinois 

In the state of Illinois, I-57 runs from the bridge over the Mississippi River north to Chicago. I-57 is the longest Interstate Highway in Illinois. Its route follows essentially the earlier route of US 51 in southernmost Illinois (US 51 has been diverted to I-57 where I-57 has always been close to old US 51 between Future City and Dongola) before taking a northeastward diagonal to Illinois Route 37 (IL 37), which remains intact as a town-to-town through route, past its interchange with I-24 (the northwestern terminus of I-24) near Pulleys Mill and a short duplex with I-64 near Mount Vernon north to Effingham, where it has a short concurrence with I-70. It then follows US 45, bypassing Champaign (where it meets I-72 and I-74), and heads north to Onarga, whereafter it follows the formerly duplex path of US 45 and (now decommissioned in most of Illinois) old US 54 to Kankakee. At Kankakee, it heads northward largely parallel to the now decommissioned route of old US 54 (since renumbered largely as IL 50) into the Chicago area, meeting I-80 in Hazel Crest, I-294 in Blue Island, and feeding I-94 on Chicago's South Side.

The route is an easy way for Chicagoans to reach Shawnee National Forest in the southern tip of the state. It also serves as a major artery for college students in the state, running near Shawnee Community College in Ullin, the main campus of Southern Illinois University in Carbondale, John A. Logan College in Carterville, Morthland College in West Frankfort, Rend Lake College in Ina, Lake Land College in Mattoon, Eastern Illinois University in Charleston, Parkland College in Champaign, University of Illinois at Urbana–Champaign in Urbana–Champaign, Kankakee Community College in Kankakee, Olivet Nazarene University in Bourbonnais, and Governors State University in University Park.

I-57 remains the only Chicago expressway that does not have a commonly used name. Its Chicago-area portion was formerly known as the Dan Ryan Expressway–West Leg. I-57 was named the Ken Gray Expressway in southern Illinois after former US Congressman Ken Gray (West Frankfort) for his work on getting the route planned through southern Illinois. A  segment from Wentworth to Sauk Trail has been designated the Tuskegee Airmen Memorial Trail, but this is not intended as a navigational name.

History 

The oldest segment of I-57 is a  strip running east of Bradley to Kankakee labeled on the 1959 Illinois state highway map. Two years later, a  stretch of I-57 from Dongola north to Marion opened on September 26, 1961. Another portion between the IL 121/US 45 exit and the Watson–Mason exit was completed and opened prior to July 1965, linking I-57 to I-70 and running in tandem with I-70 for several miles, with access to Indianapolis, Indiana, to the east and St. Louis, Missouri, to the west. A  section of I-57 in Jefferson County from Bonnie (using a temporary road that is still partially visible from the northbound lanes) to IL 161 later opened on December 9, 1969. The portion of I-57 in Chicago (known as the Dan Ryan West Leg Extension) was constructed and opened in segments between 1963 and 1970. It remains the most recent Interstate Highway to be established within the city. The final section of I-57 in Illinois opened in December 1971 at Paxton.

The portion of I-43 from Milwaukee to Green Bay was originally numbered as Interstate 57. The number was changed due to the existence of I-57 in Illinois.

I-57 was widened to six lanes in Effingham from 2011 until 2016.

For many years, an interchange at the junction of I-57 with I-294 did not exist. It was one of the few places in the US where Interstates cross but have no interchange. The Illinois Department of Transportation (IDOT) and Illinois State Toll Highway Authority (ISTHA) opened Phase 1 of a new interchange in 2014, providing access from I-57 north to I-294 north and from I-294 south to I-57 south. Phase 2 which completed the remaining movements except for northbound I-57 to southbound I-294 and northbound I-294 to southbound I-57 was opened to traffic on September 11, 2022.

Future 

I-57 is slated to eventually be extended west along US 60 to Poplar Bluff, Missouri, and then south along the US 67 corridor to North Little Rock, Arkansas, ending at I-40. In April 2016, a provision designating US 67 from North Little Rock to Walnut Ridge, Arkansas, as "Future I-57" was added into the federal fiscal year 2017 Transportation, Housing and Urban Development funding bill and officially became law in 2017.

Missouri has already upgraded  of the US 60/US 67 corridor between Sikeston and Route 158 near Harviell to a mixture of freeway and expressway segments. All at-grade crossings along the corridor would have to be eliminated before the Interstate designation could be applied. In August 2022, redesign of the US 67 and U.S. Route 160/ Route 158 interchange began. The interchange be transformed to contain roundabouts.

On February 23, 2018, Arkansas state officials unveiled a "Future I-57" sign to be posted along the corridor of US 67. A route for I-57 from Walnut Ridge to the Missouri state line was chosen in 2022. The route shows it passing near levees. The route is not finalized, and the I-57 route may be adjusted to not have any impact on the levees.

Exit list

Charleston business loop

Interstate 57 Business (I-57 Bus.) in Charleston begins at I-57 exit 10. From this diamond interchange, it runs north in a concurrency with Route 105 along South Main Street into the city center. It then turns east onto Marshall Street, which also carries US 62 and Route 77. The business route ends at I-57 exit 12, with US 62 and Route 77 continuing to the east.

See also

References

External links 

Illinois Highway Ends: Interstate 57

 
57
57
57
Transportation in Scott County, Missouri
Transportation in Mississippi County, Missouri
Transportation in Alexander County, Illinois
Transportation in Pulaski County, Illinois
Transportation in Union County, Illinois
Transportation in Johnson County, Illinois
Transportation in Williamson County, Illinois
Transportation in Franklin County, Illinois
Transportation in Jefferson County, Illinois
Transportation in Marion County, Illinois
Transportation in Fayette County, Illinois
Transportation in Clay County, Illinois
Transportation in Effingham County, Illinois
Transportation in Shelby County, Illinois
Transportation in Cumberland County, Illinois
Transportation in Coles County, Illinois
Transportation in Douglas County, Illinois
Transportation in Champaign County, Illinois
Transportation in Ford County, Illinois
Transportation in Iroquois County, Illinois
Transportation in Kankakee County, Illinois
Transportation in Will County, Illinois
Transportation in Cook County, Illinois